Saint-Geniez-ô-Merle (Limousin: Sent Genes au Merle) is a commune in the Corrèze department in central France.

Geography
The Maronne river forms the commune's southern boundary.

Population

See also
Communes of the Corrèze department

References

Communes of Corrèze